Artavazd Karamyan (born 14 November 1979), commonly known as Artyom Karamyan, is an Armenian former footballer and former international for the Armenia national football team. Artavazd is the twin brother of fellow football player Arman Karamyan.

Club career

Arabkir
Artavazd Karamyan began playing football as a senior in 1996. That year, both he and his younger brother Arman Karamyan joined Arabkir.

Pyunik Yerevan
In 1997, they both made their way to Pyunik Yerevan. Artavazd was a part of Pyunik when they won the Armenian Premier League in 2001 and 2002, the Armenian Cup in 2002 and Armenian Supercup in 1997 and 2002.

Kilikia Yerevan & return to Pyunik Yerevan
Both brothers moved to Kilikia Yerevan in 1999 and back to Pyunik in 2001.

Panachaiki Patras
They both joined the Football League (Greece) in 2003 when they both signed with Panachaiki Patras.

Arsenal Kyiv
From 2003 to 2004, they both played in Ukrainian Premier League club Arsenal Kyiv.

Rapid București
Artavazd and Arman both joined Liga I club Rapid București in 2004. While Artavazd would remain in the club for a number of seasons, Arman left that season. While Artavazd was playing for the club, Rapid București became finalists in the 2005–06 Divizia A championship and won the Cupa României in 2005–06 and 2006–07. The club also made it to the quarterfinals of the 2005–06 UEFA Cup.

Politehnica Timişoara
Both Artavazd and Arman reunited in the club Politehnica Timişoara in 2007. The next season, the club was a finalist in the 2008–09 Liga I championship.

Steaua București
The Karamyan brothers moved to Steaua București in 2010. After finishing Liga I for the 2009–10 season, the brothers ended their contracts with Steaua București. A search began to find the club they would both continue playing football in. But the process of finding a new club was delayed. Later, it was reported that the brothers were in talks with FC Brașov. However, the head coach of Brașov Daniel Isăilă later stated that the transition of the Karmanyans was unlikely to be completed because of the complexity of the negotiations, which reached a standstill. Talks were later made for the brothers to play for Astra Giurgiu, coached by Mihai Stoichiță. But after Stoichiță departed from the club, the talks ended. According to an edition of TotalFootball, because of the long search for a new team, the financial conditions for the Karamyan brothers increased to that of a required minimum of 10,000 euros per month. The option that both players finish their playing careers and enter into coaching activities was considered. In mid-September 2010, the search was over for Karamyan brothers.

Unirea Urziceni
The football players signed a contract with and officially moved into Unirea Urziceni.

In late October 2011, Stoichiță, who knew firsthand the playing abilities of both brothers, invited them to his current team Mioveni. However, Artavazd decided to retire as a player and go into business.

Buftea
A year later, Artavazd resumed his career and he and Arman both joined the Liga II club Buftea. In their first meeting, Artavazd scored twice. Arman also scored a goal in their second match.

International career
Karamyan was a member of the Armenia national team and had participated in 50 international matches and scored 2 goals since his debut in an away friendly match against Guatemala on 9 January 2000 ending 1–1. In 2010, he left the national team.

Style of play
His main merits are speed and free kicks.

Personal life
Artavazd is married and has two daughters.

At the end of 2014, Karamyan and his brother took Romanian citizenship.

National team statistics

International goals

Honours

Club
Pyunik Yerevan
Armenian Premier League (2): 2001, 2002
Armenian Cup (1): 2002
Armenian Supercup (2): 1997, 2002

Rapid București
Liga I Runner-up (1): 2005–06
Liga I 3rd place (1): 2004–05
Cupa României (2): 2005–06, 2006–07
UEFA Europa League Quarter-finalist (1): 2005–06

Politehnica Timişoara
Liga I Runner-up (1): 2008–09
Cupa României Runner-up (2): 2006–07, 2008–09

References

External links

armfootball.tripod.com

1979 births
Armenian twins
Living people
Footballers from Yerevan
Armenian footballers
Armenia international footballers
Armenian expatriate footballers
FC Pyunik players
Panachaiki F.C. players
FC Arsenal Kyiv players
FC Rapid București players
FC Politehnica Timișoara players
FC Steaua București players
FC Unirea Urziceni players
LPS HD Clinceni players
Ukrainian Premier League players
Super League Greece players
Liga I players
Armenian Premier League players
Expatriate footballers in Greece
Expatriate footballers in Ukraine
Expatriate footballers in Romania
Armenian expatriate sportspeople in Greece
Armenian expatriate sportspeople in Ukraine
Armenian expatriate sportspeople in Romania
Twin sportspeople
Naturalised citizens of Romania
Romanian people of Armenian descent
Association football wingers